Edmund Barwell, D.D. (1766–1832) was a priest and academic in the late sixteenth and early seventeenth centuries.

Browne was educated at Christ's College, Cambridge, graduating B.A. in 1568; MA in 1571; and B.D. in 1578. He was Fellow of Christ's from 1570 to 1581; and then Master until his death in 1609.  He was Rector of Toft, Cambridgeshire from 1584.

References 

Alumni of Christ's College, Cambridge
Fellows of Christ's College, Cambridge
Masters of Christ's College, Cambridge
1609 deaths